Trencreek is a hamlet in the parish of Jacobstow, north Cornwall, England, United Kingdom.

Colan
Trencreek is also a hamlet in the parish of Colan, mid Cornwall.

Newquay

Trencreek is also a suburb of Newquay, Cornwall, England, UK.

References

Hamlets in Cornwall